James Hilliard Polk (December 13, 1911 – February 18, 1992) was a United States Army four-star general who served as Commander in Chief, United States Army Europe from 1967 to 1971. He was one of the last senior commanders in the army to have served in the horse cavalry.

Military career
Polk was born at Camp McGraw in Batangas in the Philippines on December 13, 1911, to Colonel Harding Polk, and the former Esther Fleming.

Polk graduated from the United States Military Academy in 1933 and was commissioned in the cavalry. Prior to World War II, he served in two cavalry regiments and attended the basic and advanced courses at the cavalry school. In 1939 at the National Horse Show at Madison Square Garden, he won first place in the Individual Military and Police Jumping event.

At the outbreak of World War II, Polk was assigned to West Point as a tactical officer. In 1943, he attended a shortened general staff course at Fort Leavenworth, and after graduation joined the 106th Cavalry Group at Camp Hood, Texas, as a squadron commander, and later as regimental executive officer. In Europe, the group fought in the hedgerows of Normandy and the breakout from Saint-Lô.

In early September 1944, Polk assumed command of the 3rd Mechanized Cavalry Group, then in combat near Metz, France, and commanded it until the end of the war. During this time, the unit was known as "Task Force Polk", and spearheaded many advances by General Walton Walker's XX Corps, part of General George S. Patton, Jr.'s Third United States Army.

After brief occupation duty in Germany at the end of World War II, Polk returned to the United States and became Chief of Tactics at the Ground General School at Fort Riley, Kansas, and later attended the Armed Forces Staff College. In 1948, he went to Tokyo in the G-2 (Intelligence) section of the United States Far East Command for the next three years.

During the Korean War, Polk was assigned as G-2 to General Ned Almond's X Corps and later as G-2 to General James Van Fleet's 8th Army, and participated in three campaigns. In August 1951, he returned stateside to attend the National War College, and was later assigned as an instructor at the Army War College. He was then made Chief of Staff of the 3rd Armored Division at Fort Knox, participating in their move to Germany. In July 1956, he was promoted to brigadier general and became assistant division commander.

Following an assignment as Assistant Chief of Staff for Plans and Operations, Land Forces Central Europe, at NATO Headquarters at Fontainebleau under General Dr. Hans Speidel, Polk returned to the U.S. and became Director of the Policy Planning Staff in the Office of the Assistant Secretary of Defense for International Security Affairs.

Upon promotion to major general, Polk took command of the 4th Armored Division, followed by being the United States commandant in Berlin from January 2, 1963, to August 31, 1964, during a time of increased Cold War tensions. In this role, Polk showed John F. Kennedy the Berlin Wall at Checkpoint Charlie on the president's visit to West Berlin in June 1963.

Polk became commander of V Corps on September 1, 1964, and in 1966 returned to CONUS to become Assistant Chief of Staff for Force Development. He returned to Europe at the end of that year, first as Deputy Commander in Chief, United States Army Europe, and six months later was promoted to four-star general as Commander in Chief, United States Army Europe. He retired from active duty on April 1, 1971.

Decorations
Polk's awards and decorations included the Army Distinguished Service Medal, the Silver Star with Oak Leaf Cluster, the Legion of Merit with two Oak Leaf Clusters, the Bronze Star Medal, the French Croix de Guerre, the French Legion of Honor, the American Campaign Medal, the Air Medal, and the Korean Presidential Unit Citation, the World War II Victory Medal, the European-African-Middle Eastern Theater Medal.

Post military career
Polk retired to El Paso, Texas, and served as Chairman of the Board of the U.S. Cavalry Association from 1978 to 1992, and President of Army Emergency Relief from 1975 to 1984.

He died on February 18, 1992, at William Beaumont Army Medical Center in El Paso, Texas after battling cancer and pneumonia. He was buried in Arlington National Cemetery. Later his wife, Josephine Leavell Polk (1913–1999), was buried with him.

His World War II letters were published in 2005 under the title World War II Letters and Notes of Colonel James H. Polk, 1944–1945. The 3d Cavalry Association has named its scholarship fund for the children of fallen 3ACR soldiers after him.

References

1911 births
1992 deaths
United States Army generals
United States Military Academy alumni
United States Army personnel of World War II
United States Army personnel of the Korean War
Recipients of the Distinguished Service Medal (US Army)
Recipients of the Silver Star
Recipients of the Legion of Merit
Recipients of the Croix de Guerre 1939–1945 (France)
Recipients of the Air Medal
Chevaliers of the Légion d'honneur
Burials at Arlington National Cemetery